Caladenia oreophila is a plant in the orchid family Orchidaceae and is endemic to south-eastern Australia. It is a ground orchid with a single leaf and a single greenish-cream flower with pale red stripes a red labellum with a greenish-cream base.

Description
The sepals and petals curve downwards, the petals more widely spreading than the sepals. The petals taper to a point and lack club-like tips. Flowering occurs in September and October.

Taxonomy and naming
This orchid was first formally described in 2006 by David Jones and given the name Arachnorchis oreophila. The description was published in Australian Orchid Research. In 2007 Gary Backhouse changed the name to Caladenia oreophila. The specific epithet (oreophila) means "hill- or mountain-loving".

Distribution and habitat
Caladenia oreophila is only known from the Cann River valley in Victoria, growing in tall forest with a sparse understorey. It probably also occurs on the Southern Tablelands of New South Wales.

Conservation
Caladenia oreophila  is listed as  "endangered" under the Victorian Flora and Fauna Guarantee Act 1988.

References

oreophila
Plants described in 2006
Endemic orchids of Australia
Orchids of Victoria (Australia)
Taxa named by David L. Jones (botanist)